Humbert I of Viennois (c. 1240 – 12 April 1307) was baron of la Tour-du-Pin and then also became, by his marriage, dauphin of Viennois.  He was the son of Albert III, baron of la Tour-du-Pin, and of Béatrice de Coligny (herself the daughter of Hugh I, lord of Coligny and of Béatrice d'Albon, dauphine of Viennois).

In 1294, Humbert became a vassal of King Philip IV of France in exchange for £500 annual pension, which would give impetus to the acquisition of the Dauphiné, by King Philip VI of France, fifty years later.

In September 1273 he married  Anne of Burgundy (daughter of Guigues VII of Viennois) – their nine children were:
John II (1280 † 1319), succeeded his father as dauphin of Viennois
 Hugues († 1329), baron de Faucigny
 Guigues († 1319), seigneur de Montauban.
 Alix (1280 † 1309), married John I (1275 † 1333), count of Forez in 1296
 Marie, married Aymar de Poitiers-Valentinois
 Marguerite, married Frederick I († 1336), Marquess of Saluzzo in 1303
 Béatrice (1275 † 1347), married Hugh I of Chalon-Arlay in 1312
 Henri (1296 † 1349), bishop of Metz
 Catherine († 1337), married Philip of Savoy (1278 † 1334), count of Piedmont and prince of Achaea in 1312

References

Sources

1240 births
1307 deaths
13th-century peers of France
14th-century peers of France
Dauphins of Viennois
Counts of Albon
Barons of France